The Hôtel Marcel Dassault is a hôtel particulier in Paris, France.

Location
It is located at 7 Rond-point des Champs-Elysées in the 8th arrondissement of Paris.

History
It was built in 1844.

It was acquired by Marcel Dassault in 1952. Since 2002, it has been home to Artcurial, an auction house owned by the Dassault Group.

References

Buildings and structures completed in 1844
Marcel Dassault
Buildings and structures in the 8th arrondissement of Paris
Marcel Dassault
19th-century architecture in France